Esplá is a Spanish surname. It may refer to
Carlos Esplá (1895–1971), Spanish Republican politician and journalist.
Óscar Esplá (1886–1976), Spanish composer